The Accuser aka L'Imprécateur is a 1977 French film directed by Jean-Louis Bertucelli. After an executive is killed in a mysterious car accident, the French offices of his multinational company based in Paris is inundated with mysteriously threatening be-ribboned anti-capitalist tracts, delivered overnight to everyone's desks. When Americans from the head office get wind of these developments, they institute a search for the perpetrator which leads to mysterious subterranean passages under the company's skyscraper.

Cast
 Jean Yanne as Director of Human Resources
 Michel Piccoli as Saint-Ramé
 Jean-Pierre Marielle as Roustev
 Marlène Jobert as Madam Arangrude
 Jean-Claude Brialy as Le Rantec
 Michael Lonsdale as Abéraud
 Robert Webber as The American Executive

Discography

The CD soundtrack composed by Richard Rodney Bennett is available on Music Box Records label (website).

References

External links
 

1977 films
Films about businesspeople
French thriller films
1970s French-language films
1970s business films
1970s thriller films
Films scored by Richard Rodney Bennett
1970s French films